Francisco Piquer Chanza (2 June 1922 – 11 December 2009) was a Spanish actor.

Piquer's career as a stage, film, television and voice actor spanned six decades beginning in 1940. He won the Prix du Cinema Writers Circle for his role as the protagonist in the 1957 film Dirty Hands. He was Juan Proctor in fourteen episodes of the comedy Studio 1 and appeared in four episodes of El Comisario among many others. One of his last film roles was in 1998 in José Luis Garci’s The Grandfather where he played the Prior of Zaratay. In 2007, he received what was his best role, that of Belardo with the National Classical Theater Company in Del Rey Abajo, Ninguno. On 11 December 2009 Francisco Piquer Chanza died in Madrid, Spain after a long illness.

References

1922 births
2009 deaths
Spanish male stage actors
Spanish male film actors
Spanish male television actors
Spanish male voice actors